Andrei Aleksandrovich Markov (born 22 March 1984) is a Russian former professional footballer.

Club career
He played in the Russian Football National League for FC Dynamo Barnaul in 2008.

External links
 
 Career summary at Sportbox
 

1984 births
Living people
Russian footballers
Association football midfielders
Dinaburg FC players
FC Dynamo Barnaul players
FK Ventspils players
FC Avangard Kursk players
FC Smena Komsomolsk-na-Amure players
FC Sakhalin Yuzhno-Sakhalinsk players
FC Novokuznetsk players
Latvian Higher League players
Russian expatriate footballers
Expatriate footballers in Latvia
Russian expatriate sportspeople in Latvia